Hum Tum was the fourth studio album of the Pakistani band Vital Signs released in January 1995.  This was the last studio album released by the band after which Junaid Jamshed, vocalist of the band, went on to pursue a career as a solo singer, Shehzad Hasan, bassist, concentrated on his work as a music producer and Rohail Hyatt, keyboards, formed a production company.

"Hum Tum" was the highest selling Vital Signs album of all time. The album included famous songs like "Janaan Janaan", acoustic pop song, "Guzray Zamanay Walay" the patent trademark sound of the band and "Dair Ho Gayee" a ghazal like track taken from "Nain Sey Nain". The album saw the progressive evolution in the Vital Signs music away from their first album to a more dark and brooding serious side with tracks like "Main Chup Raha", "Un Ka Khayal" and "Namumkin".

Singles from the album included "Hum Tum", "Un Ka Khayal" and "Yehi Zameen".

The compilation album titled "Hum Hain Pakistani - Mega Remix" released in 1997 was basically a re-release of "Hum Tum" with an addition of two new songs namely, "Khelon Sey Zindagi" and "Hum Hain Pakistani - remixed".

Track listing
All music arranged, composed and produced by Vital Signs. All songs written by Shoaib Mansoor, those which are not are mentioned below.

Personnel
All information is taken from the CD.

Vital Signs
Junaid Jamshed Khan - vocals
Rohail Hyatt - keyboard, backing vocals
Shehzad Hasan - bass guitars

Additional musicians
Guitars by Asad Ahmed on all the tracks except for "Teray Liye" (Unplugged) and "Aitebar" (Unplugged) by Aamir Zaki

Production
Produced & arranged by Rohail Hyatt
Recorded & Mixed at Master Control Studios in Karachi, Pakistan
Sound engineering by Rohail Hyatt and Shahzad Hasan
Photography by Asif Raza

External links
Vital Signs - A Personal History by NFP

1995 albums
Vital Signs (band) albums
Urdu-language albums